Nooglutyl is a nootropic agent that was studied at the Research Institute of Pharmacology, Russian Academy of Medical Sciences as a potential treatment for amnesia.

In animal models, it has a variety of central nervous system effects.

References

AMPA receptor positive allosteric modulators
Nootropics
Nicotinamides
Russian drugs
Dicarboxylic acids